Wensleydale Beacon is a hill, 110 m, situated just north of Fumarole Bay, on the west side of Port Foster, Deception Island, in the South Shetland Islands. The hill was charted by a British expedition 1828–31, under Foster. Named by Lieutenant Commander D.N. Penfold,  Royal Navy, following his survey of the island in 1948–49, after Wensleydale in Yorkshire, England.

References

Hills of the South Shetland Islands
Geography of Deception Island